Gamage is a Sinhalese or Welsh surname. Notable people with the surname include:

 Anoma Gamage, Sri Lankan politician
 Barbara Sidney, Countess of Leicester (1563–1621), Welsh heiress 
 Chamila Gamage (born 1979), Sri Lankan cricketer
 Dharshana Gamage (born 1979), Sri Lankan cricketer
 Harry Gamage (1900–1994), American football coach
 Janak Gamage (born 1964), Sri Lankan cricketer
 K. A. Gamage (died 2009), Sri Lankan army officer
 Lahiru Gamage (born 1988), Sri Lankan cricketer
 Lal Dharmapriya Gamage, Sri Lankan architect and politician
 Lalith Gamage, Sri Lankan academic
 Piyasena Gamage (born 1949), Sri Lankan politician
 Saheli Rochana Gamage (born 1988), Sri Lankan singer
 Willy Gamage, Sri Lankan politician

See also
 Gamages, London department store
 Gammage (disambiguation)
 

Surnames of Sri Lankan origin
Sinhalese surnames